Babati is an administrative ward in the Babati Urban District of the Manyara Region of Tanzania. 
According to the 2012 census, the ward has a population of 16,718.

References

Wards of Manyara Region
Babati District